Quassolo is a comune (municipality) in the Metropolitan City of Turin in the Italian region Piedmont, located about  north of Turin. 

Quassolo borders the following municipalities: Settimo Vittone, Tavagnasco, Brosso, and Borgofranco d'Ivrea.

References

Cities and towns in Piedmont